The Tunnel is a 2011 Australian found-footage monster horror film directed by Carlo Ledesma (in his feature-length directorial debut) and co-written, co-produced, and co-edited by Julian Harvey and Enzo Tedeschi. The film stars Bel Deliá, Andy Rodoreda, Steve Davis, Luke Arnold, Goran D. Kleut, and James Caitlin in a documentary-style horror story set in the underground network of abandoned railway tunnels in Sydney, Australia, where a journalist and her crew discover an evil, flesh-eating creature lurking within the tunnels.

Plot
The film is framed as a documentary, occasionally cutting away to interviews with Natasha and Steven recorded after the events.

In the midst of the drought and water shortages, the Government of New South Wales announced plans to recycle millions of litres of water trapped in a network of abandoned train tunnels beneath the heart of Sydney. However, the government suddenly goes cold on the plan, and it does not tell the public why. There is also talk of homeless people who use the tunnel as shelter going missing. This and the silence from the ministers leads a journalist, Natasha, to begin an investigation into a government cover-up. She and her crew Peter (producer), Steven (camera operator), and Tangles (audio engineer) decide to investigate the story and plan to enter the tunnels themselves. After being refused entry by a security guard, they find an alternate entry and make their way inside. They proceed to explore the tunnels and locate various abandoned homeless squats and sections used as air raid shelters in the 1940s.

They come upon a huge underground lake; and, while filming, Tangles hears strange noises through the audio headphones. Later, the group heads to the room where the World War II air raid bell is. To get footage of the bell's ringing, Natasha hits it; but Tangles says the sound's loudness is distorting the audio recording. He decides to take the boom-mike into an adjoining room to reduce the sound levels, leaving Peter with the headphones to listen for distortion in the bell volume. Natasha hits it again, and Peter hears something very disturbing in the headphones. Tangles' audio cable is suddenly pulled through the opening, snapping and disappearing. The rest of the crew panics and goes to look for Tangles.

The scene switches to the interview, where Natasha is allowed to hear this recording for the first time. As the sound of the bell plays, screams of agony can be clearly heard before the headphone wire snaps. Upon going back to the bell room minutes after they left, the crew finds that all their equipment has disappeared. While searching for Tangles, they find a room blocked off by corrugated metal. Natasha puts down her night-vision camera to help Peter and Steve. They get into the room and are horrified to find large amounts of still dripping blood, as well as Tangles' abandoned torch. At the entrance of the room, Natasha picks up the camera, noticing that it is not where she had left it. Reviewing the footage, it is revealed that something picked up the camera and is stalking them.

The crew ventures through the tunnel, trying to find a way out. They hear a person call down to them, and they come upon the security guard who had earlier refused them entry. The group tell him that one of their crew has gone missing, but the guard instead tells them to quickly follow him and get out, ignoring their pleas to help them find Tangles. Something pounces on the guard as he nears a corner, dragging him out of sight into another tunnel with incredible speed. The group flees, screaming in terror through the narrow tunnels. They hide in a room and stay there until they believe whatever the thing that grabbed the security guard has left the immediate surroundings. In an attempt to find a way out, they soon return to the underground lake. Hearing something nearby, they extinguish all light and use the night-vision camera to look toward the sound. There, they discover the security guard, his eyes missing, whimpering in pain in the shallows of the lake. The crew watches in horror as a tall, emaciated, demonic humanoid appears behind him and brutally murders him, slowly twisting his head until his neck breaks. Natasha lets out a scream, attracting the creature's attention; and the terrified group runs with the monster almost immediately giving chase after them.

They come to a dead-end with a barred opening into a street above them (which Natasha screams up into for help), but when that fails, the group continues searching for an exit. At one point, the creature attempts to grab Peter from an opening; however, when Steven shines the camera's light on it, the monster immediately retreats. Steven realizes that the beast is vulnerable to or afraid of light. Upon reaching another dead-end, Natasha discovers a side route blocked by planks of wood. Entering this new room, they find signs of some living being, as well as a small pile of human flesh. The main camera loses power, and Steve frantically attempts to replace the battery. Just as the power switches the light on again, the monster attacks, knocking Peter and Steven to the ground. Natasha, panic-stricken, runs off with the night-vision camera. On her own, she stays in silence but is confronted by the monster, who cracks the camera lens as it grabs at her, dragging her as the small camera still records. Steven and Peter follow the sound of her screams and the monster's movements.

Through the night-vision camera, it is shown that Natasha was dragged back to the lake. The monster attempts to drown Natasha; but before it can succeed, Steven and Peter use the light to chase it away. As Steven helps Natasha, Peter is heard in the distance screaming and challenging the monster, drawing it away from the other two. Steven manages to drag Natasha to a well-lit tunnel near a train station. They rush back and drag a badly-wounded Peter to the safety of the train platform. There, captured on CCTV, Natasha begs for help, and uses a borrowed cell phone to call the emergency services. The crew ends up staying in the tunnel all night.

In the epilogue, it is stated that the coroner found that Peter eventually died from extensive internal bleeding. Natasha resigned after the underground shoot, no longer working as a journalist. Steven still works as a news cameraman. Tangles' whereabouts remain unknown, and his family is still searching for answers. The police investigation was closed due to "contradictory evidence".

Cast
 Bel Deliá as Natasha Warner 
 Andy Rodoreda as Peter Ferguson 
 Steve Davis as Steve Miller 
 Luke Arnold as Jim 'Tangles' Williams 
 Goran D. Kleut as Stalker/monster
 James Caitlin as Trevor Jones
 Russell Jeffrey as Sef

Production
The film was funded using a crowd-funded financing model, as part of the 135k Project, where the film's writer-producers Enzo Tedeschi and Julian Harvey pre-sold individual digital frames of the film for A$1, to raise the film's $135,000 target budget.

Principal photography took place in Sydney, comprising on-location shoots in some of the city's disused tunnels, as well as a public pool and the Royal Australian Navy's World War II air raid shelters at Garden Island. It was shot non-sequentially in 14 days (including pick-ups) and then edited by the writing-producing team of Enzo Tedeschi and Julian Harvey.

Release

Distribution
The film has been noted for its modes of release and distribution. In addition to its conventional modes of release, including a limited Australian theatrical release, screenings on Showtime Australia, and an Australian and New Zealand DVD release through Paramount Pictures Australia and Transmission Films, also released in North America in one theater and DVD by Blackrock Films, the film has garnered much attention for its unconventional release through BitTorrent. The Tunnel was the first Australian film to be distributed and promoted legally through the BitTorrent internet downloading platform, a release strategy which exposed the film to tens of millions of people, for free. This free and legal online release is a cooperation between the filmmakers, peer-to-peer distribution platform VODO and BitTorrent Inc., which is distributing the film through an app on its client.

On 18 May 2011 The Tunnel had its official premiere at Event Cinemas, Bondi Junction, at a Popcorn Taxi screening and Q&A event, and was also released simultaneously on DVD, TV and BitTorrent.

Home media
The film was released on DVD in United States by House Lights Media Partners on 27 December 2011.

Reception

Box office
The Tunnel was shown in only one North American theater during its entire theatrical run, limiting its box-office earnings.

It also ran on several screens in Australia, its country of origin, to reportedly full cinemas. This was side-by-side with simultaneous releases in that territory on DVD, cable, iTunes, and via a custom iPad app.

Critical reception
The film has a 100% approval rating on Rotten Tomatoes with an average score of 7/10, based on 7 reviews.

Richard Kuipers from Variety gave the film a positive review, writing, "Making the most of super-atmospheric locations never previously seen in an Aussie feature, debut helmer Carlo Ledesma is well served by his convincing quartet of thesps. Special kudos goes to Steve Davis, a real-life cameraman who performs impressively while also filming a sizable portion of the finished product". However, Kuipers felt that the film failed to reveal anything on the malevolent presence that lurked in the darkness.
James Mudge from Beyond Hollywood.com gave the film a positive review, writing, "Though The Tunnel nevertheless remains above average and better crafted than most of the never-ending stream of found footage horrors, these missteps prevent it from shaking off the shackles of the form or from finding appeal outside dedicated fans. Still, there’s enough here to make the prospect of a sequel not unpalatable, and despite its faults the film does manage to raise the pulse rate from time to time".

In 2014, popular horror movie website Bloody Disgusting listed the film as one of the "13 Scariest Mockumentaries Ever Made".

In 2015, Buzzfeed listed the film as one of "13 Australian Horror Movies That Will Scare The Shit Out of You".

Awards
Prior to its completion, The Tunnel earned an award and a nomination for its innovative online campaign. The Tunnel has continued to receive award recognition in the festival circuit.

Won
 17th Annual AIMIA Awards:
 Best Use of Social Media, Word of Mouth or Viral (DLSHS - Ahmed Salama, Valeria Petrenko)
 A Night of Horror International Film Festival:
 Best Australian Director (Carlo Ledesma)
Screamfest Horror Film Festival:
Best Special Effects - 2011

Nominations
 Australian Directors Guild Awards | 2010:
 Cross Platform Interactive (Ahmed Salama, Valeria Petrenko)
 17th Annual AIMIA Awards:
 Peoples Choice Award (DLSHS - Ahmed Salama, Valeria Petrenko)

Sequel
In March 2012 it was announced that a sequel to The Tunnel is planned. The project is called The Tunnel: Dead-End and circles around a sibling who searches for her brother who got lost in the tunnels. No other updates on the sequel have been announced ever since.

See also 
 Qanat
 Found footage

References

External links
 
 
 
 
 
 
 Deadhousefilms.com

2011 films
Australian horror films
2011 horror films
Films set in Sydney
Films shot in Sydney
Found footage films
2010s monster movies
2010s psychological horror films
Camcorder films
2010s mockumentary films
Films about film directors and producers
Australian independent films
2010s English-language films